Epidola stigma is a moth of the family Gelechiidae. It was described by Staudinger in 1859. It is found in North Africa, Portugal, Spain, France, Greece and on the Canary Islands and Cyprus.

References

Moths described in 1859
Epidola